Elections to Ballymena Borough Council were held on 5 May 2005 on the same day as the other Northern Irish local government elections. The election used four district electoral areas to elect a total of 24 councillors.

Election results

Note: "Votes" are the first preference votes.

Districts summary

|- class="unsortable" align="centre"
!rowspan=2 align="left"|Ward
! % 
!Cllrs
! % 
!Cllrs
! %
!Cllrs
! %
!Cllrs
! % 
!Cllrs
!rowspan=2|TotalCllrs
|- class="unsortable" align="center"
!colspan=2 bgcolor="" | DUP
!colspan=2 bgcolor="" | UUP
!colspan=2 bgcolor="" | SDLP
!colspan=2 bgcolor="" | Sinn Féin
!colspan=2 bgcolor="white"| Others
|-
|align="left"|Ballymena North
|bgcolor="#D46A4C"|43.7
|bgcolor="#D46A4C"|3
|21.2
|2
|11.0
|1
|5.0
|0
|19.1
|1
|7
|-
|align="left"|Ballymena South
|bgcolor="#D46A4C"|61.3
|bgcolor="#D46A4C"|5
|19.1
|1
|12.2
|1
|5.9
|0
|1.5
|0
|7
|-
|align="left"|Bannside
|bgcolor="#D46A4C"|62.3
|bgcolor="#D46A4C"|3
|18.9
|1
|8.6
|0
|10.1
|1
|0.0
|0
|5
|-
|align="left"|Braid
|bgcolor="#D46A4C"|53.8
|bgcolor="#D46A4C"|3
|27.1
|1
|10.0
|1
|9.1
|0
|0.0
|0
|5
|-
|- class="unsortable" class="sortbottom" style="background:#C9C9C9"
|align="left"| Total
|55.2
|14
|21.6
|5
|10.4
|3
|7.6
|1
|5.2
|1
|24
|-
|}

Districts results

Ballymena North

2001: 2 x DUP, 2 x UUP, 2 x Independent, 1 x SDLP
2005: 3 x DUP, 2 x UUP, 1 x SDLP, 1 x Independent
2001-2005 Change: DUP gain from Independent

Ballymena South

2001: 4 x DUP, 2 x UUP, 1 x SDLP
2005: 5 x DUP, 1 x UUP, 1 x SDLP
2001-2005 Change: DUP gain from UUP

Bannside

2001: 3 x DUP, 1 x UUP, 1 x SDLP
2005: 3 x DUP, 1 x UUP, 1 x Sinn Féin
2001-2005 Change: Sinn Féin gain from SDLP

Braid

2001: 2 x DUP, 2 x UUP, 1 x SDLP
2005: 3 x DUP, 1 x UUP, 1 x SDLP
2001-2005 Change: DUP gain from UUP

References

Ballymena Borough Council elections
Ballymena